La Bou is a chain of bakery-café cafe restaurants in the
Sacramento area which sells sandwiches, soups, salads, breads and bakery items. It also has locations in Auburn, Roseville, Folsom and Elk Grove.

Corporate history
In 1982, the first La Bou store opened its doors offering owner Trong Nguyen's handmade croissants.

La Bou has expanded to 26 company-owned stores and franchised units all serving croissants and espresso drinks, in addition to pastries, soups, salads and sandwiches. In Sacramento, La Bou has a presence in the following areas:

•South Land Park
•Fruitridge Road
•Madison
•Poseys
•Howe
•West Sacramento
•9th Street
•11th Street

Other locations in California where La Bou has a presence include Folsom, Elk Grove, Roseville, Rocklin, Granite Bay and Carmichael.

La Bou also has a digital online presence. In 1999, they started a Corporate Catering initiative under the name "La Bou Delivers" for the local business community.

New franchises are no longer available.

References

External links
Official website

Bakeries of California
Bakery cafés
Restaurant chains in the United States
Restaurants established in 1981
Fast casual restaurants
Restaurant franchises
Companies based in Sacramento, California
1981 establishments in California
Coffeehouses and cafés in the United States